Living rock can refer to:
Rock-cut architecture, in phrases such as "hewn from the living rock"
Dwarf succulent plants resembling stones, especially of the genera:
Ariocarpus
Astrophytum
Aztekium
Epithelantha
Geohintonia
Lithops
Lophophora
Obregonia
Turbinicarpus
Strombocactus
Pyura chilensis, a tunicate that resembles a mass of organs inside a rock

See also
Live rock